Coleophora frankii is a moth of the family Coleophoridae. It is found from Germany to Italy, Croatia and Hungary.

The larvae feed on Aster linosyris. They create a small, tubular silken case, decorated with some length rows of fine sand grains. It is less than 5 mm long. The case is trivalved and the mouth angle is about 45°. Larvae can be found from June to September.

References

frankii
Moths described in 1886
Moths of Europe